Acta Oeconomica is a quarterly peer-reviewed academic journal published by Akadémiai Kiadó. It covers theoretical and general issues related to the East European and Hungarian transition processes, economic policy, econometric methods, and economic modelling. 

The journal was established in 1966 by the Hungarian Academy of Sciences and is a hybrid open-access journal. The editor-in-chief is Péter Mihályi (Corvinus University of Budapest).

Abstracting and indexing
The journal is abstracted and indexed in:

According to the Journal Citation Reports, the journal has a 2021 impact factor of 0.939, ranking it 326 out of 379 journals in the category "Economics".

References

External links

Economics journals
English-language journals
Quarterly journals
Publications established in 1966
Akadémiai Kiadó academic journals